is a dark, elongated and oblate asteroid, classified as near-Earth object and potentially hazardous asteroid of the Aten group, approximately 2.2 kilometers in diameter. It was discovered on 8 March 2000, by astronomers of the Lincoln Near-Earth Asteroid Research at the Lincoln Laboratory's Experimental Test Site near Socorro, New Mexico. The body has a notably low albedo, and its shape resembles that of a "clenched fist".

Orbit and classification 

 orbits the Sun at a distance of 0.8–1.1 AU once every 11 months (336 days; semi-major axis of 0.95 AU). Its orbit has an eccentricity of 0.12 and an inclination of 22° with respect to the ecliptic. A first precovery was found in the Digitized Sky Survey from images taken at ESO's La Silla Observatory in February 1977. The body's observation arc begins with its official discovery observation at Socorro in March 2000.

Close approaches 

In February 2012, it was observed by radar during a close approach (0.045 AU) at the Arecibo and Goldstone observatories. The observations allowed to model the body's spin period and rotation, as well as its shape (see below).

Physical characteristics 

 has been characterized as a Xk-subtype, which transitions between the X- and K-type asteroids.

Rotation period, pole, and shape 

Analysis of the lightcurve gave a period of 8.947 hours with a brightness amplitude of 0.60 magnitude.

Radar observations at Arecibo and Goldstone showed that the asteroid spins in a retrograde manner with a rotation period of 8.96 hours. It is likely a principal axis rotator, i.e., not tumbling.  Shape modelling by two independent teams gave sidereal periods of 8.96 and 8.944 hours, respectively. A spin axis of (80.0°, −50.0°) in ecliptic coordinates was determined. The observations also revealed that the asteroid has an elongated oblate shape, resembling a "clenched fist". Its surface exhibits multiple kilometer scale ridges and concavities.

Diameter and albedo 

According to shape modeling of radar observations, the asteroid's overall dimensions are 2.6×2.2×2.1 kilometers. Based on an absolute magnitude of 18.2, this results in a notably low albedo of 0.018. More recent modeling combining radar, photometric, and infrared data gave and even more elongated shape of 2.9×2.2×1.5 kilometers. These authors argue that the absolute magnitude value is incorrect and report a geometric albedo of 0.09.

's mean-diameter measures between 2.0 and 2.26 kilometers and its surface has an albedo between 0.018 and 0.09. The Collaborative Asteroid Lightcurve Link adopts an albedo of 0.018 and a diameter of 2.26 kilometers based on an absolute magnitude of 18.2.

Numbering and naming 

This minor planet was numbered on 26 September 2007, after its orbital parameters had been sufficiently determined. As of 2018, it has not been named.

Notes

References

External links 
 Imaging near-Earth asteroid (162421) 2000 ET70
 Asteroid (162421) 2000 ET70 3D model
 Asteroid Lightcurve Database (LCDB), query form (info )
 Asteroids and comets rotation curves, CdR – Observatoire de Genève, Raoul Behrend
 
 
 

162421
162421
162421
162421
20000308